Shahrak-e Shahid Dastghib or Shahrak-e Shahid Dastgheyb may refer to:
 Shahrak-e Shahid Dastgheyb, Fars
 Shahrak-e Shahid Dastghib, South Khorasan